The Kallang–Paya Lebar Expressway (KPE) is the third newest of Singapore's network of expressways. The southern (Kallang) section of the expressway opened first, on 26 October 2007, with the remaining (Paya Lebar) section opened on 20 September 2008.

Built at a cost of approximately S$1.8 billion (USD$1 billion), it is the longest subterranean road tunnel in Southeast Asia. The KPE is also believed to be the world's sixth longest underground road project at its time under construction. In all, the dual-carriageway expressway with three lanes in each direction will have eight interchanges, eleven on-ramps, and twelve off-ramps. The south end of the KPE also connects directly to the Marina Coastal Expressway which opened on 29 December 2013.

The Land Transport Authority (LTA) has awarded a contract for the expansion of the KPE/TPE interchange at the north end of the expressway and construction of a new road connection to Punggol Central, providing a new and more direct link to and from the KPE and TPE, and alleviating the traffic congestion of the TPE between the current KPE ramps and Punggol ramps.
The work would involves the design and construction of roads, three new vehicular bridges crossing Sungei Serangoon and Sungei Blukar, a new flyover across TPE and other associated ramps. Construction works commenced in the second quarter of 2015.

History
A 2.8 km-long Kallang Expressway (KLE) was envisioned as early as 1981, serving as a link between the Pan Island Expressway (PIE) and East Coast Parkway (ECP). It would have become the shortest expressway in Singapore if it was built.

The modern Kallang–Paya Lebar Expressway (KPE) was first conceptualised in the preliminary plans of 1997, merging the KLE and the Paya Lebar Expressway (PLE) into a single expressway.

Construction on KPE started in the year 2001, and was fully completed in 2008. On 23 June 2007, the northern end of the expressway between Tampines Road from the new Defu Flyover and the Tampines Expressway was opened to traffic, and was temporarily named Tampines Service Road. Tampines Road will therefore no longer connect with the Tampines Expressway at the Tampines Flyover. The Defu Flyover along Tampines Road, along with the traffic signals, were commissioned on the same day from 1000 hours.

On 27 July 2007, the LTA announced the opening of the southern ECP-PIE section of the expressway (Phase 1) to traffic on 26 October that year. The entire expressway opened to traffic on 20 September 2008.

Route

The Kallang section of the expressway starts from eastern end of the Marina Coastal Expressway, where it also interchanges with the East Coast Parkway near the fourteen-kilometre mark of the ECP in a northward direction, goes underground below the Geylang River, cuts across the Kallang Sports Complex to the west of the National Stadium, comes to an interchange at the Mountbatten Road/Nicoll Highway/Guillemard Road junction, crosses the East West MRT line, before ending with an interchange with the Pan Island Expressway at the thirteen-kilometre mark of the latter. It adds along some slip roads and minor roads.

The Paya Lebar section continues from where the Kallang Section leaves off beneath the Kallang River and Pelton Canal past MacPherson Estate, comes to an interchange with Paya Lebar Road, Upper Paya Lebar Road, MacPherson Road and Airport Road, crosses over the Circle MRT line which was under construction at the same time as the expressway, and continues for almost three and a half kilometres underground beneath Airport Road and the Paya Lebar Air Base, emerges at ground level near Defu Lane 3, goes on an elevated interchange over Tampines Road. It meets Buangkok East Drive at an interchange before continuing towards the existing Tampines Flyover to meet with Tampines Expressway. It replaces one of the fish farms at Tampines Road.

On 27 July 2007, the LTA announced an extension of the KPE from East Coast Parkway to the Ayer Rajah Expressway via Marina South. The stretch was named Marina Coastal Expressway (MCE). The Marina Coastal Expressway officially opened on 29 December 2013.

List of exits

Public education and congestion management
In 2006, the Land Transport Authority (LTA) engaged an advertising agency to embark on a public education programme, to inform and educate the public on the proper way to use the KPE – the first time it has done so for a road project. British firm Bartle Bogle Hegarty (BBH) has been appointed to publicise safety messages needed to prepare users for the KPE. BBH, which in turn appointed British public relations firm Grayling, clinched the contract for S$2.81 million. Its campaign started in the second quarter of 2007, consisting of a website and an album Sounds of the Underground of ten songs for the purpose.

The LTA has also put up a tender calling for consultants to develop congestion management systems in the KPE. The call has drawn three submissions. It also rolled out the first dedicated team of Traffic Marshals, with the primary role of rapid deployment to any incident within the tunnels. The annual contract was awarded to Certis CISCO, who would deploy six marshals on motorcycles around the clock in the KPE, to be expanded to 28 motorcycles and three cars across all expressways by the end of 2008.

Speed cameras
KPE's underground section is fitted with digital speed cameras that operate 24 hours throughout the day to enforce the 80 km/h speed limit (lower if safety advisories display so).

In the first week of phase 1 operation 3,400 motorists were caught speeding in the KPE, consisting of 3% of the total traffic which alarmed the traffic police. 45 of the speed violators which were in excess of 40 km/h received court summons, while others received either a traffic summons or a warning letter from the Land Transport Authority.

The speed cameras are easily spotted in the middle section of the tunnel and are found under the main via ducting. There have been no instances of speed cameras flashes indicating a violating vehicle exceeding the limit, as the luminosity in the tunnel does not require additional light source.

References

External links
 Land Transport Authority webpage on KPE
 KPE Information Portal

Expressways in Singapore
Road tunnels in Singapore
Kallang
Geylang
Hougang
Marina East
Paya Lebar
Sengkang
Tunnels completed in 2007
Transport infrastructure completed in 2007
Transport in North-East Region, Singapore
2007 establishments in Singapore